Xanthodynerus is a genus of potter wasps known from the Afrotropical and Palearctic regions. It may be synonymous with Euodynerus.

References

Biological pest control wasps
Potter wasps